Able Seaman Rebecca Brown is a fictional TV character on the show Sea Patrol. She is portrayed by Kirsty Lee Allan.

History 

Rebecca is a young Navy sailor who became the new chef of the new Armidale-class HMAS Hammersley when the previous chef, Toby Jones left after the decommissioning of the Fremantle-class Hammersley.

Personal life 
When Bomber started out on the ship, she realised that she had made good friends in RO and Spider. But Spider, who secretly likes her, kept on annoying her and soon she lost her temper. When the ship was doing a boarding drill organised by Buffer, Spider pushed her too far, over a minor incident about chips, and she nearly pushed him off the boat. Buffer and Swain stopped him from falling overboard. Her short temper caused Buffer to threaten her with disciplinary action.  Spider refused to accept her initial apology. Bomber redeemed herself later, when she and Spider were trapped below deck on a ship used to smuggle venomous snakes.  Bomber remained calm and devised a plan for them to escape.  After this incident Spider accepted her apology and Buffer decided not to follow through on his threat, provided she kept her temper in check.

On Bomber's 21st birthday, she and Spider fall overboard while Buffer is distracted by his mother's terminal illness.  Bomber takes charge and keeps calm, while trying to calm down the panicked Spider, using their uniforms as makeshift flotation devices.  Because Buffer did not notice their absence it takes the crew of the Hammersley too long to notice they're gone.  Before the Hammersley finds them Bomber spots a pleasure boat and they are rescued, only to realise that the boat is transporting an escaped criminal, the drug dealer Liam McClean.  They manage to hide their identities (as Naval personnel) from McClean and his two accomplices until a radio broadcast asking for assistance in search and rescue of two navy sailors.  When the boat is spotted by the search party, the Hammersley come to investigate.  Bomber manages to leave her bracelet on the deck, but XO does not recognize it until she returns to the Hammersley and sees the ship's video-log.  The Hammersley then head  back to the boat with the aim of rescuing them.  Bomber and Spider try to escape (with the help of the ship-owner's wife) but McClean spots them and forces Bomber to take him to the plane.  The Hammersley manages to prevent the plane from landing and she and Spider are rescued.

During the hostage event she reveals to Spider that she and her mother were not on speaking terms and she later talks about her mother to Buffer as if they were on good terms.

Later in the series, her and RO's connection grows. RO likes Bomber and she is mutually attracted to him, but won't bring herself to admit it, plus, they can't act on it because it's against protocol. They both share a mutual respect, but Bomber loses her temper with RO when he mistakes her friendship for affection and reports to the CO that they have engaged in fraternisation in breach of protocol. RO redeems himself, but continues to have feelings for Bomber even though she insists they can only ever be friends.

In season 4 2Dads and Bomber share a night of passion while on shore leave. They are unsure of whether or not they are going to pursue their relationship, but while on the boat they kiss and are caught by Swain. Bomber decides to get a shore posting so that she and 2Dads can be together but in the 1st episode of season 5 we hear from 2Dads that Bomber has broken off the relationship via email.

Navy career 
Bomber has some large boots to fill taking over from Chefo, but transferring to Hammersley from a larger frigate has given her some strong galley skills and she soon starts to fit in well with the rest of the crew, despite the afore mentioned episode with the chips.

Bomber's duties also include assisting Swain as Hammersley's second medic.  Again, this a role she has taken over from Chefo, but an area where she is far less comfortable and often struggles to keep her emotions and her temper under control.

Bomber's joins Hammersley in the rank of Able Seaman and as she grows more confident she looks into the option of maybe going for promotion to Leading Seaman, but a series of unfortunate events get in her way, firstly causing her to question whether she sees any future in the Navy at all, and ending with the romance with 2-Dads causing her to finally reach the decision that the Navy is not the career she wants after all.

Awards

 

Sea Patrol characters
Fictional chefs
Fictional Royal Australian Navy personnel